Abacha is a town in Anambra State in the southeastern part of Nigeria. It is bordered by Abatete, Nimo, Oraukwu and Eziowelle towns. It forms part of the ten communities in the [Idemili North] Local Government Area of Anambra State, and it is also part of the Anambra Central Senatorial Zone. Its people are among the Igbo-speaking communities in the eastern part of Nigeria. Abacha comprises Five official villages; Umudisi, Umuazu, Umuokpolonwu, Umuekpeli, and Ugwuma, with Nogba kindred aspiring to be a village of their own. Umuokpolonwu village of Abacha has two villages, namely: Umunneora and Umuaribo.

Chief Nwabunwanne Godwin Odiegwu was crowned Ezedioramma Ikendim Abachaleku III, Igwe (King) of Abacha on January 9, 2021, after the Willie Obiano Administration deposed his predecessor, Igwe Godwin Chuba Mbakwe, although the matter is still in a court of competent jurisdiction to determine the legality or otherwise of what was done by the then Willie Obiano Administration; adjudged by Ndi Anambra as the worst performing Governor after Chinwoke Mbadinuju, and his certificate of recognition as Igwe was withdrawn in December of 2020 by Willie Obiano, the Governor of Anambra State.

References

Towns in Anambra State